Liangxiang railway station is a railway station in Liangxiang, Fangshan District, Beijing, China. It serves as an intermediate freight station of the Beijing–Guangzhou railway, while passenger services are provided by the Sub-Central line of Beijing Suburban Railway since 30 June 2020.

History 
Liangxiang railway station was opened in January 1899 as a station of Peking–Hankow railway, following the completion of its Lugouqiao-Baoding section. A coal transportation railway from Liangxiang to Tuoli was completed in July 1904. In 1954, two tracks were added to Liangxiang station following the doubling of Beijing–Hankou railway between Liangxiang and Liulihe, while the track length of Liangxiang station was extended to 850 meters. The coal railway was once defunct in 1944 and rebuilt in 1954, then extended to Cijiawu coal mines in 1970, and further extended to Chenjiafen in June 1973 to serve Da'anshan Coal Mines, thus becoming Liangxiang–Chenjiafen railway. Huangcun–Liangxiang railway, a railway branch from Liangxiang to Huangcun was completed in October 1970. The tracks of Liangxiang railway station was furthermore extended to 1,050 meters in 1994.

As the construction of Beijing West railway station began, the proposal of a connecting railway between Beijing West and Liangxiang was accepted in 1990, and construction started in 1991. This railway was opened in 1996. In May 2020, it was decided that the Sub-Central line of Beijing Suburban Railway would be extended to Liangxiang, and modifications were then implemented to the station. After the modification, suburban passenger services of Liangxiang railway station started on 30 June 2020.

Connections 
Liangxiang railway station is located on the eastern end of Jingdian Road (京电路), a 500-meter alley east of Haotian Street (昊天大街), the nearest major road to the station. A bus shuttle route F79 is offered from Haotian Street to the station square, but only operates before morning train departures (to railway station) or after evening train arrivals (the other way round). Bus stops for regular routes are located south of the intersection of Haotian Street and Jingdian Road, with a 500-meter distance from Liangxiang railway station.
 Beijing Bus stops:
Liangxiang Railway Station (on Haotian St): 646, 896, 951, 971, 993, F28, F35, F79

References 

Railway stations in Fangshan District
Stations on the Beijing–Guangzhou Railway
Railway stations in China opened in 1899